The horn-skinned bat (Eptesicus floweri) is a species of vesper bat. It can be found in Mali and Sudan in subtropical or tropical dry shrubland, subtropical or tropical dry lowland grassland, and hot deserts.

Sources

Eptesicus
Taxonomy articles created by Polbot
Mammals described in 1901
Bats of Africa
Taxa named by William Edward de Winton